Brian Stanley is a British historian, best known for his works in the history of Christian missions and world Christianity.

Biography 
He was educated at Whitgift School in Croydon, Surrey. He received his BA, MA, and PhD degrees in history from the University of Cambridge and has taught in theological colleges in London, Bristol, and Cambridge.

From 1996 to 2001, he was director of the Currents in World Christianity Project at the University of Cambridge. During his tenure in Cambridge he also served as the director of the Cambridge Centre for Christianity Worldwide (formerly the Henry Martyn Centre) and was a fellow of St Edmund's College. He joined the faculty at the University of Edinburgh in January 2009 and served as Director for the Centre for the Study of World Christianity at the School of Divinity in the University of Edinburgh until 2018. He is currently Professor of World Christianity.

He is also currently the chief editor of the academic journal Studies in World Christianity and part of the editorial board of The Journal of Ecclesiastical History. Along with Robert Eric Frykenberg, Stanley is co-editor of the Studies in the History of Christian Missions book series from the William B. Eerdmans Publishing Company.

Bibliography 
 
 
 
 
 
 
 
 
 
Stanley, Brian (2018). Christianity in the Twentieth Century: A World History. Princeton, NJ: Princeton University Press. .

Further reading 

 Chow, Alexander, and Emma Wild-Wood (Eds, 2020). Ecumenism and Independency in World Christianity: Historical Studies in Honour of Brian Stanley. Leiden: Brill.

References

External links 

 Centre for the Study of World Christianity, New College, Edinburgh

1953 births
British historians
Christian missions in Africa
Academics of the University of Edinburgh
Religion academics
Living people
Alumni of the University of Cambridge
World Christianity scholars
History of Christianity in Africa
People educated at Whitgift School
British Baptists